Kristinia Jamie DeBarge (born March 8, 1990) is an American singer, songwriter, dancer and actress. DeBarge first appeared on national television in 2003 as a contestant on the American Idol spin-off, American Juniors. In 2009, DeBarge signed a contract with the Island Records department Sodapop, releasing her debut album, Exposed, in July of the same year.

Life and career

Family and early life
Born in 1990, DeBarge is the daughter of James DeBarge. DeBarge began singing when she was 3 years old, but did not begin to take it seriously until she was 12. When she was 12, her father took her into a recording studio where they worked until 4 A.M. recording a duet titled "How I Feel Inside", which made her father realize that she was serious about beginning a singing career.

During Summer 2003 she was a contestant on the American Idol spin-off, American Juniors. DeBarge progressed to the semi-final round of 20 contestants. She was featured in the first group of ten semi-finalists and sang the song "Reflection" from the Disney film Mulan. However, she was not one of the five to progress from that group into the final ten.

DeBarge is of mixed race. Her father is of African American, English and French Canadian descent. Her mother is of Mexican, Irish, Scottish, English, Norwegian, Spanish and French descent.
DeBarge's ancestors on her mother's side include, 6th great-grandfather
Robert Sevier and 6th great-granduncle  John Sevier (first member of the Watauga Association/founding father of Tennessee), and first cousin twice removed Elías Nandino, a Mexican poet and confidant of Frida Kahlo. Among her mother's distant relatives are King Robert I of France and Lady Margaret Erskine.

2009: Exposed 

At 14, DeBarge was introduced to Kenneth "Babyface" Edmonds.  She worked with him for five years and, two days before her nineteenth birthday, signed to a new division of Island Def Jam Records founded by Edmonds and Jeff Burroughs called Sodapop Records. DeBarge's first single "Goodbye" off her debut album Exposed was released in April 2009. "Goodbye" met with commercial success in the United States, the single debuted at number 75 on the Billboard Hot 100 singles chart, and later reached a peak of number 15 on the chart. The single was also a success in Canada, where it reached a peak of number 15 on the Canadian Hot 100. Exposed, was released on July 28, 2009. Exposed received generally positive reviews from music critics, based on an aggregate score of 69/100 from Metacritic. In the United States, the album debuted at number 23 on the Billboard 200. DeBarge also opened up for pop singer Britney Spears, during Spears' 2009 world tour, The Circus Starring: Britney Spears.

2009–13: After Exposed and new album Young & Restless

In November 2009, The Wet Seal, Inc., a leading specialty retailer to young women, announced a partnership with DeBarge which included a collection of fashion pieces selected by DeBarge. In January 2010, DeBarge received an NAACP Image Award nomination for "Outstanding New Artist". DeBarge made an appearance in School Gyrls, which premiered on Nickelodeon in March 2010. In September 2012, DeBarge released her single "Cry Wolf" from her exclusive Japan album Young & Restless. In October 2012, the "Cry Wolf" music video was premiered on her VEVO artist page.  On November 9, 2012, DeBarge made her acting debut in "Christmas in Compton" starring Keith David, Omar Gooding, Sheryl Lee Ralph and Eric Roberts.

On April 3, 2013, DeBarge released another single ("Ignite") from Young & Restless exclusively to Japan through Manhattan Records. The song peaked at number six one day after its release on the Japanese iTunes R&B Chart. On May 29, 2013, DeBarge released another single from the album, "Higher".

2014: Third studio album and School Dance
DeBarge was featured on Redrama's new single and music video "Let Go" on January 17, 2014. DeBarge and Redrama performed on live television for Finland's finals of the Eurovision Song Contest 2014 at the Barona Areena in Espoo on February 1, 2014. The single was a success in Finland, where it reached No. 1 on NRJ's Top 10 list on February 4, 2014, and No. 1 on Spotify on February 7, 2014.  The single reached a peak of No. 3 on the Finnish Single Charts. On February 25, 2014, the single reached a peak of No. 1 on the Finnish Airplay Charts.

DeBarge started working on her third studio album in March 2014 with Adonis Shropshire. DeBarge's second acting role came on July 2, 2014, in Nick Cannon's directorial debut School Dance where she plays the lead female role, Anastacia. The film has an ensemble cast of Bobb'e J. Thompson, Mike Epps, Luenell, Katt Williams, George Lopez, and The Rangers.

2015: New Music Mondays and Growing Up Hip Hop

On January 5, 2015, DeBarge and Adonis Shropshire started exclusively releasing new music to YouTube. She entitled the project "New Music Mondays". On July 8, 2015, WE tv announced it would mine the stories of real-life rap industry families on "Growing Up Hip Hop". Set to air January 7, 2016, the six-episode reality series stars DeBarge, Angela Simmons, Damon "Boogie" Dash, Romeo Miller, Egypt Criss, and TJ Mizell and some of their famous parents appeared on the show. DeBarge announced in an interview in September 2015 that she would be releasing a new studio album around the premiere of Growing Up Hip Hop.

2016 - Present: New Music
DeBarge released two EPs and a single in 2016: Thinkin Out Loud, Peaceful Understanding and "Crystal Ball". In 2017, she partnered with Priority/Capitol Records and released the single "Pink Love". On July 31, 2018, she independently released the single "Hangover".  On December 22, 2018, she independently released the single "Alright". In 2019, she released two singles "Breathe" and "Back in the Day" and on April 21, 2020, she released her single "Carousel". On June 11, 2021, she released a new song "Bet" featuring Eric Bellinger.

2018: Krissy D Cosmetics
On September 30, 2018, DeBarge announced the formation of her new cosmetics company, Krissy D Cosmetics. The online company launched on November 23, 2018, with the “Amethyst Collection” (a 17 piece vegan brush set), the “Aplysina Blender” (a makeup sponge) and the “3D Inlashuation Mascara” (a waterproof and smudge free mascara that sold out within minutes). On February 12, 2019, the company released the "World Tour" eyeshadow palette.

Tours

Opening act
• The Circus Starring Britney Spears (2009)

Discography

Studio albums

EPs

Singles

As featured artist

Music videos

Filmography

Film

Television

Awards and nominations

Notes

References

External links
 Official website
 Official soundcloud
 Kristinia Debarge at YouTube
 

1990 births
Living people
21st-century American actresses
21st-century American women singers
African-American actresses
African-American women singers
American contemporary R&B singers
American film actresses
American child singers
American women pop singers
American musicians of Mexican descent
DeBarge family
Island Records artists
Actresses from Pasadena, California
American people of Irish descent
Musicians from Pasadena, California
Singers from California
Participants in American reality television series
21st-century American singers